Giovanni Ambrogio Bevilacqua,  also known as il Liberale Bevilacqua (active by 1481 to at least 1512) was an Italian  painter active in Lombardy in a late-medieval or early Renaissance style. He was a pupil of Vincenzo Foppa of Milan.

Biography
Bevilacqua was apparently born in Milan to a carpenter named Pietro. By 1481, he was noted under the patronage of Duke Francesco Sforza. He signed in 1485 a fresco depicting Saints Roch, Sebastian, and Christopher and perhaps also completed a Madonna and Saints with Donors for the parish church of Landriano.

Works
Madonna and Child, Museo Bagatti Valsecchi of Milan,
Madonna Piccinella, Sforza Castle Pinacoteca of Milan
Madonna with Child, St Peter Martyr, King David, and Donor, Pinacoteca Brera, Milan
Castello Visconteo (Pavia)
Metropolitan Museum of New York,
National Museum of Art of Luxembourg
Madonna and Child with St John the Baptist, St Bernard of Clairveaux and a donor, Accademia Carrara in Bergamo, 
Waddesdon Manor in England

References

15th-century Italian painters
Italian male painters
16th-century Italian painters
Painters from Milan
Year of death unknown
Year of birth unknown
Italian Renaissance painters
Year of birth uncertain